Events in 2016 in anime.

Awards
10th Seiyu Awards

Releases

Television series
A list of anime television series that debuted between 1 January and 31 December 2016.

Films
A list of feature-length anime films that debuted in theaters between 1 January and 31 December 2016.

OVA/ONA
A list of anime that debuted on DVD, Blu-ray, online, or in other media during 2016.

Highest-grossing films
The following are the 10 highest-grossing anime films of 2016.

See also
2016 in Japanese television (general)
2016 in Brazilian television
2016 in Polish television
2016 in Portuguese television
2016 in Spanish television
2016 in animation
2016 in television

References

External links 
Japanese animated works of the year, listed in the IMDb

Years in anime
anime
anime